The 1873 Bath by-election was fought on 27 June 1873.  The byelection was fought due to the succession to a peerage of the incumbent MP of the Conservative Party, Viscount Chelsea. It was won by the Conservative candidate Viscount Grey de Wilton.

References

1873 in England
Politics of Bath, Somerset
1873 elections in the United Kingdom
By-elections to the Parliament of the United Kingdom in Somerset constituencies
19th century in Somerset